Iqbal Durrani is an Indian writer, director, actor and producer of Hindi films.

Filmography

Books
He wrote "Gandhi Se Pehle Gandhi" on the life of revolutionary tribal "Birsa Munda" of Jharkhand. Published in 2008, it was acclaimed both in the literary and the film world and was compared with Maxim Gorky's "Mother" by leading critics of Hindi literature.

He has been invited to speak on Bhagwan Mahavir's life & his teachings by various Jain organisations. It so happened that despite being a Muslim, he was invited inside of a Digambar Jain Temple (Ranchi) to speak in front of Jain Priests on Bhagwan Mahavir. In a world where religion is used as a weapon he is trying to use it as a bridge to span the widening gap among the people.

He has been writing books and scripts with spiritual contents. At present, he is working on Bhagwan Shri Mahavir. Iqbal Durrani is the only person in the world to translate Samveda in Hindi and Urdu. He announced about it in Uttar Pradesh saying that he is currently working on it.

Awards
He has received several awards for his social activities and writing, including:
 Jharkhand Ratna award in the year 2008 at Ranchi by Pt. Raghunath Rai Santhali Cinema & Art. 
 Rajiv Gandhi Global Excellence award in the year 2010 at N. Delhi by Urdu Press of India.
 Babasaheb Ambedkar award in the year 2011 at Mumbai by Maharaje Yashwantrao Holkar Prathishtan.
 Vidya Vachaspati's degree (Equivalent to Doctorate's degree) awarded by Sahitya Kala Sangam, Pratapgarh.

In 2009, he contested Lok Sabha elections but lost.

References

External links
 

Wikipedia articles needing rewrite from April 2012
Hindi-language film directors
Indian male screenwriters
1956 births
Living people
20th-century Indian Muslims
Indian people of Pashtun descent
People from Banka, Bihar
Film directors from Bihar
20th-century Indian film directors